Petticoat Government was written by Baroness Orczy, author of The Scarlet Pimpernel, in 1910. It was released under the title Petticoat Rule in the U.S. in the same year. The book was released with a third title: "A Ruler of Princes," for a limited printing in 1909.

A story of the French aristocracy, the book concerns Madame de Pompadour's influence over the King and France. The story focuses on young heroine Lydie D'Aumont, who is caught between two suitors: hot-headed childhood friend Gaston de Stainville, and a more reserved English lord, Henry Dewhyrst, Marquis of Eglinton. The novel bears some similarities with its predecessor, "The Scarlet Pimpernel," and it is possible that the hero shares some relation with a character from that novel, Lord Antony Dewhurst.

References

External links 

 Petticoat Government on Google Books

1910 British novels
Historical novels
Novels by Baroness Emma Orczy
Novels set in France
Hutchinson (publisher) books
Novels set in the 18th century